The 2017 Canoe Marathon European Championships is the fourteenth edition of the Canoe Marathon European Championships, which took place between 29 June and 2 July 2017 at Ponte de Lima, Portugal. The competition consisted of sixteen events – nine in kayak and seven in canoe – divided in junior, under–23 and senior categories.

Medalists

Juniors

Under 23

Seniors

Medal table

References

External links
 

Canoe Marathon European Championships
Canoe Marathon European Championships
International sports competitions hosted by Portugal
Marathon European Championships
Canoeing in Portugal
June 2017 sports events in Europe
July 2017 sports events in Europe